The 2011–12 CERS Cup was the 32nd season of the CERS Cup, Europe's second club roller hockey competition organized by CERH. 28 teams from nine national associations qualified for the competition as a result of their respective national league placing in the previous season. Following a preliminary phase and two knockout rounds, Bassano Hockey 54 won the tournament at its final four, in Bassano del Grappa, Italy on 12 and 13 May 2012.

Preliminary phase 
The preliminary phase legs took place on 19 November and 17 December 2011.

|}

Knockout stage
The knockout stage consisted in double-legged series for the round of 16 and the quarterfinals, where the four winners would join the Final Four in Vendrell, Spain.

Final four

Semifinals

Final

See also
2011–12 CERH European League
2011–12 CERH Women's European League

International
 Roller Hockey links worldwide
 Mundook-World Roller Hockey
Hoqueipatins.com - Results from Roller Hockey

References

External links
2012 CERS Cup Final Four at cerh.eu
Bassano 54 website

External links
 CERH website
  Roller Hockey links worldwide
  Mundook-World Roller Hockey

World Skate Europe Cup
CERS Cup
CERS Cup